Sirngmikuluk (Inuktitut syllabics: ᓯᕐᖕᒥᑯᓗᒃ) formerly Narsarsuk Glacier is a glacier in the southeastern Byam Martin Mountains of Bylot Island, Nunavut, Canada.

See also
List of glaciers in Canada

References

Glaciers of Qikiqtaaluk Region
Arctic Cordillera